Jean-Valentin Metzinger (19 April 1699, Saint-Avold – 12 March 1759, Ljubljana) was a French-born Austrian-Slovenian painter, in the Baroque style.

Life and work
His ancestors were originally from Italy. He was one of twelve children born to François Metzinger (died 1721), and his wife, Maria Magdalena née Valentini; including his twin brother, Jean-Philippe. Where he had his first painting lessons is unknown. He later studied in Bologna, Venice and Rome, but there is no record of attendance at any academies. In Rome, his primary contacts were with other French artists, although he seems to have been influenced by Guido Reni, Peter Paul Rubens and Bartolomé Esteban Murillo, among others. Some speculations have centered on time in Germany, but those influences are not apparent until much later in his life.

The first known reference to his presence in Ljubljana (then called Laibach) is in a municipal revenue book, from 1727, when he made a payment toward acquiring a license. In that record, he is described as a "professional painter". Why he chose to settle there is unknown. He was married in 1731, to an older woman, and had no children.

His first employment came from the Franciscans, who commissioned numerous works between 1727 and 1730, in Novo mesto (Neustädtl) and Brežice (Rann). Some of his projects were accomplished in areas that are now part of Croatia, including Jastrebarsko, Samobor, Klanjec, and Trsat. He also received commissions from the Capuchins.

His wife preceded him in death by six months. He died, following a long illness, at the age of sixty; leaving his estate to a nephew. Most of his works are in Ljubljana, but they may also be seen in Styria, Passau, and Trieste. Over 500 works have been attributed to him, although many may have largely been done by assistants in his workshop. Some exist in several versions.

References

Further reading
 Anica Cevc, Valentin Metzinger, 1699–1759. Življenje in delo baročnega slikarja, exhibition catalog, Narodna galerija, Ljubljana 2000
 David Krašovec, Problematika Metzingerjevega šolanja (problems of Metzinger's schooling), Narodna galerija, 2001 
 David Krašovec, Valentin Metzinger. Lorenec na Kranjskem (Lorraine in Carniola), Educy, 2000

External links 

 "Valentin Metzinger: Življenje in delo baročnega slikarja" @ National Gallery of Slovenia
 "Valentin Metzinger" @ Slovenski baročni slikarji

1699 births
1759 deaths
18th-century French painters
Austrian painters
Slovenian painters
Religious painters
People from Saint-Avold